The Fordyce Home Accident Ins. Co. is a historic building at 300 North Main Street in downtown Fordyce, Arkansas.  It was designed by architect Charles L. Thompson in Classical Revival and Romanesque styles and built in 1908.  The two-story building occupies a prominent position in Fordyce's downtown area, standing out because of its corner tower, capped by a terra cotta finial.

The building was listed on the National Register of Historic Places in 1982.

See also
National Register of Historic Places listings in Dallas County, Arkansas

References

Office buildings on the National Register of Historic Places in Arkansas
Romanesque Revival architecture in Arkansas
Neoclassical architecture in Arkansas
Buildings and structures completed in 1908
Buildings and structures in Fordyce, Arkansas
Historic district contributing properties in Arkansas
National Register of Historic Places in Dallas County, Arkansas
1908 establishments in Arkansas